Newlove may refer to:

 NewLove, a computer virus

People
 George Hillis Newlove (1893–1984), American accounting scholar
 Helen Newlove, Baroness Newlove (born 1961), British life peer
 John Newlove (poet) (1938–2003), Canadian poet
 John Newlove (rugby league) (born 1944), English rugby league footballer of the 1960s, 1970s, and 1980s (father of Paul Newlove)
 Paul Newlove (born 1971), English rugby league footballer of the 1980s, 1990s and 2000s (son of John Newlove)
 Denise Newlove (born 1968), Scottish cricketer
 Richard Newlove, English rugby league footballer

See also 
 New Love (disambiguation)